This article is about the particular significance of the year 1727 to Wales and its people.

Incumbents
Lord Lieutenant of North Wales (Lord Lieutenant of Anglesey, Caernarvonshire, Denbighshire, Flintshire, Merionethshire, Montgomeryshire) – George Cholmondeley, 2nd Earl of Cholmondeley 
Lord Lieutenant of Glamorgan – vacant until 1729
Lord Lieutenant of Brecknockshire and Lord Lieutenant of Monmouthshire – Sir William Morgan of Tredegar
Lord Lieutenant of Cardiganshire – John Vaughan, 2nd Viscount Lisburne
Lord Lieutenant of Carmarthenshire – vacant until 1755 
Lord Lieutenant of Pembrokeshire – Sir Arthur Owen, 3rd Baronet
Lord Lieutenant of Radnorshire – James Brydges, 1st Duke of Chandos

Bishop of Bangor – William Baker (until 19 December)
Bishop of Llandaff – Robert Clavering  
Bishop of St Asaph – John Wynne (until 17 December); Francis Hare (from 17 December)
Bishop of St Davids – Richard Smalbroke

Events
22 June - On the death of his father, King George I of Great Britain, the Prince of Wales becomes King George II of Great Britain. 
25 August - Herbert Mackworth inherits the Gnoll estate, Neath, on his father's death.
17 October - In the general election:
Bussy Manse becomes MP for Cardiff.
Hugh Williams (of Chester) retains his seat as MP for Anglesey.
date unknown
The Piercefield estate is sold for £3,366, 5.6d to Thomas Rous of Wotton-under-Edge.
Sir Roger Mostyn, 3rd Baronet, becomes Custos Rotulorum of Flintshire.

Arts and literature

New books
Rowland Ellis - English translation of Ellis Pugh's Annerch ir Cymru (the first Welsh book printed in America)
William Gambold - A Grammar of the Welsh Language
Matthias Maurice - Y Wir Eglwys

Births
4 May - Paul Panton, antiquarian collector (died 1797)
8 June - Thomas Morgan (of Rhiwpera), politician (died 1771)
date unknown - , hymn-writer (died 1783)

Deaths
25 August - Sir Humphrey Mackworth, industrialist and politician, 70
6 September - George Hooper, Bishop of St Asaph 1703-4, 86
date unknown - Ann Maddocks, the "Maid of Cefn Ydfa", 23

References

1720s in Wales
Years of the 18th century in Wales